Orlando Alexis Sinclair Hernández (born 19 April 1998) is a Costa Rican professional footballer who plays as a forward for Saprissa.

Career 
Sinclair signed with Loudoun United FC on March 1, 2019.
	
On January 16, 2020, Sinclair was announced as part of the inaugural roster for New England Revolution II of USL League One.

Honours

Club 
Saprissa
Liga FPD: Clausura 2021

References

External links

1998 births
Living people
Costa Rican footballers
Costa Rican expatriate footballers
Association football forwards
Deportivo Saprissa players
Loudoun United FC players
USL Championship players
New England Revolution II players
USL League One players